Morion may refer to:
 Morion (helmet), a type of military helmet
 Morion (mineral), a variety of smoky quartz
 Morion (beetle), a genus of beetles in the family Carabidae
  formerly Empire Fang, an Empire F type coaster